Ebert Cardoso da Silva (born 25 May 1993), or simply Ebert,  is a Brazilian professional footballer who plays as a defender for Kukësi.

Career
Ebert is a product of the Internacional youth sportive system, while in Brazil, he also played for Macaé. In early 2018, Ebert signed a two and a half years contract with Ukrainian Premier League club Stal Kamianske. One year later, in January 2019, he joined Bulgarian club Botev Plovdiv.

On 3 February 2020, FC Urartu announced the signing of Ebert. On 14 July 2020, Ebert left Urartu by mutual agreement. On 31 July 2020, Ebert signed for FC Van. On 23 January 2021, Ebert left Van by mutual consent.

Personal life
His older brother, Everton Cardoso da Silva, is also a professional football player.

References

External links
Profile at Soccerway
Profile at Zerozero 

1993 births
Living people
Brazilian footballers
Brazilian expatriate footballers
Macaé Esporte Futebol Clube players
Itumbiara Esporte Clube players
Sport Club Internacional players
FC Stal Kamianske players
Botev Plovdiv players
FC Urartu players
FC Van players
FC Metalist Kharkiv players
Ukrainian Premier League players
Ukrainian Second League players
First Professional Football League (Bulgaria) players
Armenian Premier League players
Expatriate footballers in Ukraine
Brazilian expatriate sportspeople in Ukraine
Expatriate footballers in Bulgaria
Brazilian expatriate sportspeople in Bulgaria
Expatriate footballers in Armenia
Brazilian expatriate sportspeople in Armenia
Association football defenders
Sportspeople from Mato Grosso